Pāvels Doroševs (born 9 October 1980) is a Latvian football goalkeeper, currently playing for SV Victoria Seelow in the German Brandenburg-Liga. He is also a former member of Latvia national football team.

Career

Club
As a youth player Doroševs was a member of Skonto Riga youth system. He was taken to the first team in 2000, but due to the fact that the team's first keeper was that time Latvia international Andrejs Piedels, Doroševs was unable to compete for a place in the starting line-up. During 2 seasons he made only 2 league appearances. In 2001 Doroševs transferred to another local club PFK Daugava, where he could finally feel the taste of game action. During 2 seasons Doroševs appeared in 27 matches, showing solid qualities for a youngster. In 2003 Doroševs was heading to Daugavpils, as he was signed by Dinaburg. His stay there was not long – 13 matches, just one season and another transfer to FK Jūrmala in 2004. 17 games were played by Doroševs that season, leading him on to another transfer that year, when he was signed by FK Rīga. It seemed that the player just wouldn't settle down, as he was thrown from club to club, as the seasons went by – after just 7 games he moved to his previous club Skonto Riga, finally finding a place to settle down. The number of appearances made grew every season, as Doroševs spent 4 full seasons with the club, playing 50 matches. Even though he had to compete for a place in the starting line-up with Andrejs Piedels once again. In 2009 an offer from the Azerbaijan Premier League appeared and Doroševs moved to Gabala. Soon after joining Doroševs claimed the first keeper's place, not only becoming the captain of the team, but also setting a new Latvian record without conceding a single goal for 952 minutes, which gave him the 67th place in the world rankings out of 450 goalkeepers. During 4 seasons Doroševs played 90 matches. In 2012, he was released. In July 2012 Pāvels returned to the Latvian Higher League, signing a contract with FK Liepājas Metalurgs. He spent 2 seasons there, making 32 league appearances, 12 of them were clean sheets. In June 2013 Doroševs returned to Azerbaijan, signing a one-year contract with Azerbaijan Premier League champions Neftchi Baku. Doroševs made his Neftchi Baku debut as a first-half substitute for Ernest Nfor, as he was sacrificed after Saša Stamenković had been sent off in their game against Baku on 10 November 2013.

International
Doroševs made his international debut against Poland on 22 May 2012 in a game, which Latvia lost 1–0. He played all 90 minutes. Currently he is the back-up keeper for Andris Vaņins. Doroševs yet again appeared in the goal for Latvia in June 2013, playing full matches in friendlies against Qatar and Turkey.

Career statistics

International

Statistics accurate as of match played 28 May 2013

Honours 
 Latvian Higher League (3): 2000, 2001, 2015  
 Latvian Cup (2):  2000, 2001
 Baltic Cup (1): 2012

References

External links 

 
 
 

1980 births
Living people
Footballers from Riga
Latvian footballers
Skonto FC players
Dinaburg FC players
FK Rīga players
Gabala FC players
FK Liepājas Metalurgs players
FK Liepāja players
FK Atlantas players
Latvian expatriate footballers
Latvia international footballers
Expatriate footballers in Azerbaijan
Expatriate footballers in Poland
Expatriate footballers in Lithuania
Expatriate footballers in Germany
Latvian expatriate sportspeople in Azerbaijan
Latvian expatriate sportspeople in Poland
Latvian expatriate sportspeople in Lithuania
Latvian expatriate sportspeople in Germany
Association football goalkeepers
Neftçi PFK players